Emery Ruelle was a professional ice hockey player who played for the Marquette Iron Rangers, Waterloo Black Hawks and Green Bay Bobcats of United States Hockey League. In 1966, he played on the United States men's national ice hockey team that was sent to compete at the International Ice Hockey Federation World Championship.

References

External links 

Living people
Year of birth missing (living people)
American men's ice hockey forwards
Ice hockey players from Michigan
People from Houghton, Michigan